Brent Ray Jones (born May 7, 1966) is an American gospel musician, pianist, and choir conductor. He started his music career, in 1999, with the release of Brent Jones & the T.P. Mobb with Holy Roller Entertainment, and this charted on three Billboard magazine charts. His second album, Beautiful, came out in 2002 with EMI GMG Records, which this charted three charts. The third album, The Ultimate Weekend, released in 2007 by Tyscot Records, and this placed on the Billboard magazine Gospel Albums chart. He released, Joy Comin, in 2014 with Echopark Records, and this placed upon the Gospel Albums chart.

Early life
Jones was born on May 7, 1966 in Los Angeles, California, as Brent Ray Jones, and he commenced his piano lessons to become a pianist at the age of six. He was installed as the music director and minister of his church at 14 years old.

Music career
His music recording career began in 1999, with the release of Brent Jones & the T.P. Mobb by Majestic Recordings on June 22, 1999, and this album placed upon three Billboard magazine charts, which were the Gospel Albums at No. 4, R&B Albums chart at No. 37, and No. 17 on the Heatseekers Albums chart. The subsequent album, Beautiful, was released on April 9, 2002 by EMI CMG Records, and this placed on the Gospel Albums at No. 7, R&B Albums at No. 35, and Heatseekers Albums at No. 19. He released, The Ultimate Weekend, with Tyscot Records on October 9, 2007, and this placed upon the Gospel Albums chart at No. 14. The fourth album, Joy Comin, was released by Echopark Records in 2014, and this charted on the Top Gospel Albums at No. 6.

Discography

References
http://www.gospelflava.com/articles/brentjones3.html
  http://www.gospelflava.com/articles/mobb.html
https://www.billboard.com/artist/brent-jones/chart-history/sll/

External links
 Official website
 Cross Rhythms artist profile

1966 births
Living people
African-American songwriters
African-American Christians
Musicians from Los Angeles
Songwriters from California
21st-century African-American people
20th-century African-American people